A Casa das Sete Mulheres (English title: Seven Women) is a 2003 Brazilian miniseries.

It was written by Maria Adelaide Amaral and Walther Negrão, with collaboration of Manfredi and Vincent Lucio Villari, based on the novel of the same name by Brazilian writer Letícia Wierzchowski, and directed by Teresa Lampreia, with the general direction of Jayme Monjardim and Marcos Schechtmann, and direction of core Jayme Monjardim.

The miniseries had Eliane Giardini, Camila Morgado, Samara Felippo, Mariana Ximenes, Daniela Escobar, Nívea Maria and Bete Mendes as the Seven Women, and still Thiago Lacerda, Giovanna Antonelli and Werner Schünemann, as the great heroes of the Ragamuffin War, living their characters true figures, which complemented the Country's History, being the same, large national icons.

Cast

References

External links 
 

Brazilian television miniseries
TV Globo telenovelas
2003 Brazilian television series debuts
2003 Brazilian television series endings
Cultural depictions of Giuseppe Garibaldi
Gaucho culture